The Yugoslav Ministry of Defence building (lit. "Federal Secretariat for the People's Defense"), also known as the Yugoslav General Staff (lit. "General Staff Building") is a building that was previously occupied by the Ministry of Defence of Yugoslavia, a governmental department responsible for defending the Federal Republic of Yugoslavia from internal and external military threats.

Considered to be a masterpiece of post-war architecture, it was bombed and heavily damaged during the NATO bombing of Yugoslavia in 1999. Today, only a small non-damaged portion of the building is used by the Ministry of Defence of Serbia.

History
The building was built between 1957 and 1965 and it was designed by Serbian architect, Nikola Dobrović. It is divided by Nemanjina Street, and its design is meant to resemble a canyon of the Sutjeska river, where one of the most significant battles of World War II in Yugoslavia was fought, with the street as a river dividing the two monumental, gradually completed tracts. As Nemanjina Street comes up the hill from the main railway station, the two parts of the building form a symbolic gate.

In addition to expressive cascading forms, facades are characterized by the application of contrasting materials - robust, brown-red stone from Kosjerić and white marble slabs from the island of Brač. The most striking visual motif representing the window bars on the facades, designed in the spirit of late modernism.

The first part of the building, standing across the government of Serbia building in Kneza Miloša street, is named Building "A" and has 12,654 square meters. The other part of the building, divided by Nemanjina Street, is named Building "B" and has 36,581 square meters.

1999 bombing

Around midnight on 29/30 April 1999, 40 days into the NATO bombing of Yugoslavia, the building was bombed two times by NATO in the space of 15 minutes, because of the structure's significance as a military facility. It was uninhabited at the time it was bombed, leading some to speculate that it was bombed more due to its symbolic significance as a representation of the state, rather than merely just for immediate tangible purposes. It was bombed once again nine days later, around midnight on 7/8 May 1999.

Post-bombing
Severely damaged by the 1999 bombing, the building has not been repaired for over a decade and is Belgrade’s most famous ruin. Since 2005, it has been the protected monument of culture, symbolizing the 1999 NATO bombing and suffering of Serbia.

Building "B" was much less damaged during the bombings, and in the following years entrance of the building has been removed, for the safety of the pedestrians. Part of the building "B" has been used by the Ministry of Defence of Serbia.

Reconstruction
In November 2015, with the budget of 650,000 euros, the first phase of reconstruction of Building "A" has started, for the purpose of structure collapse prevention. By May 2016, the central part was entirely demolished and the pillars for the part of building close to the street were poured. Around 5,000 square meters was demolished.

In February 2017, the government of Serbia has decided to demolish most of the Building "A" construction with the obligation to re-build it to its original appearance once the country has the funds. This sudden decision was explained with the high cost of the further reconstruction amounting to the estimated 7.66 million euros, while the demolition was estimated at 1.46 million euros. Minister of Defence of Serbia, Zoran Đorđević said that experts advocated for this solution despite already paid first phase of the reconstruction, while the military experts condemned this decision. On 9 March 2017, the Association of Serbian Architects (an informal, private group) launched an initiative for the submission of candidature for the UNESCO World Heritage Site, also saying that the Government of Serbia wanted to remove it from the register of cultural properties, but due to the long legal procedure resorted to the reconstruction. The Association condemned the decision and marked it as a "definitive loss of our culture" as it is a "monument of suffering and brutality of NATO forces". In March 2015, on the occasion of the 16th anniversary of the beginning of NATO intervention, the government of Serbia organized a ceremony in front of the ruined building which some observers interpreted as the evidence that the ruin has indeed become a de facto war monument.

Proposals for other purposes
Over the years, there have been talks that the building could be turned into a luxurious hotel of The Trump Organization. Following the reconstruction of Building "A" and later proposed demolition of the most of the construction, Prime Minister of Serbia Aleksandar Vučić, said that there are plans for the construction of Monument to Stefan Nemanja and Museum of medieval Serbia on the place of the Building "A".

Gallery

References

External links

Buildings and structures in Belgrade
Military of Yugoslavia
Military headquarters
Ruins in Serbia
1965 establishments in Yugoslavia
1960s establishments in Serbia
1999 disestablishments in Serbia
NATO airstrikes
Military installations of Yugoslavia
Attacks on military installations in the 1990s
Closed military installations
Attacks on government buildings and structures
Headquarters in Serbia
Savski Venac
Building bombings in Europe